Sher-E-Bangla Nagar Government Boys' High School is a public secondary school located in Agargaon, Dhaka, Bangladesh. The school was established in 1969 as "Central Government Boys' High School". After the independence of Bangladesh in 1971, the name of the school was changed according to its local area. In addition to its high school curriculum, the school started college level education in 2008.

The school is ranked in Group B since the overall quality, facilities and performance of this school is one of the best in Dhaka city.

The school is used as a polling station. However, in the controversy in 2006 over election arrangements, this was one of the place where draft voter lists were not posted.

Class Hours:  
7:00 am – 12:10 pm  (Morning Shift) (Class I - XII) And
12:30 pm – 5:15  pm   (Day Shift)    (Class III - XII)

SSC Result

HSC Result

References 

Schools in Dhaka District
Boys' schools in Bangladesh
High schools in Bangladesh
Educational institutions established in 1969
1969 establishments in East Pakistan